Abortion in Rhode Island is legal. On June 19, 2019, the legal right to abortion was codified into Rhode Island law by passage of the Reproductive Privacy Act.

History

Legislative history 
By the end of the 1800s, all states in the Union, except Louisiana, had therapeutic exceptions in their legislative bans on abortions. In the 19th century, bans by state legislatures on abortion were about protecting the life of the mother, given the number of deaths caused by abortions; state governments saw themselves as looking out for the lives of their citizens.

The state was one of ten states in 2007 to have a customary informed consent provision for abortions. In 2013, state Targeted Regulation of Abortion Providers (TRAP) law applied to medication induced abortions and private doctor offices, in addition to abortion clinics.

As of May 14, 2019, the state prohibited abortions after the fetus was viable, considered to be 24 weeks. This period uses a standard defined by the US Supreme Court in 1973 with the Roe v. Wade ruling. Another provision was on the books banning abortion at 12 weeks but it was not enforceable by law. In May 2019, Rhode Island's Senate Judiciary Committee considered a bill that would have allowed the right to an abortion to be codified into state law, before finally rejecting it.

On June 19, 2019, both the Rhode Island Senate and the Rhode Island House of Representatives passed the Reproductive Privacy Act. The House voted 45–29, and the Senate voted 21–17. Governor Raimondo signed the legislation soon after. The Reproductive Privacy Act banned Rhode Island from restricting “an individual person from preventing, commencing, continuing, or terminating that individual’s pregnancy prior to fetal viability” or after fetal viability “to preserve the health or life” of the pregnant individual. It also forbade state restrictions on contraceptives, repealed bans on partial-birth abortions, forbade medical professionals from being charged with felony assault for performing abortions, and repealed requirements for abortion providers to notify a husband before giving his wife an abortion.

On August 27, 2019, a motion was filed in Superior Court which alleges that the Reproductive Privacy Act violated Article I, Section 2, of the Constitution of Rhode Island. These allegations are premised on plaintiffs' argument that Article I, Section 2, prohibits the General Assembly from passing any law that would grant or secure any rights relating to abortion or the funding thereof. The motion was dismissed in 2022.

Judicial history 
Before the US Supreme Court decision Roe v. Wade decriminalized abortion nationwide in 1973, abortion was already legal in several states, but the decision imposed a uniform framework for state legislation on the subject. It established a minimal period during which abortion is legal (with more or fewer restrictions throughout the pregnancy). That basic framework, modified in Planned Parenthood v. Casey (1992), remains nominally in place, although the effective availability of abortion varies significantly from state to state, as many counties have no abortion providers. Planned Parenthood v. Casey held that a law cannot place legal restrictions imposing an undue burden for "the purpose or effect of placing a substantial obstacle in the path of a woman seeking an abortion of a non-viable fetus".

Clinic history 

Between 1982 and 1992, the number of abortion clinics in the state increased from five in 1982 to six in 1992. In 2014, there were three abortion clinics in the state. In 2014, 80% of the counties in the state did not have an abortion clinic. That year, 36% of women in the state aged 15–44 lived in a county without an abortion clinic. In 2017, there was one Planned Parenthood clinic, which offered abortion services, in a state with a population of 246,389 women aged 15–49.

Statistics 
In the period between 1972 and 1974, there were no recorded illegal abortion deaths in the state. In 1990, 137,000 women in the state faced the risk of an unintended pregnancy. In 2010, the state had no publicly funded abortions. In 2014, 63% of adults said in a poll by the Pew Research Center that abortion should be legal in all or most cases. In 2017, the state had an infant mortality rate of 6.2 deaths per 1,000 live births.

Abortion rights views and activities

Protests 
Women from the state participated in marches supporting abortion rights as part of a #StoptheBans movement in May 2019.

References 

Rhode Island
Healthcare in Rhode Island
Women in Rhode Island